Ilomska is right tributary of the Ugar river in (Bosnia). It is an essential body of water for surrounding wildlife. Ilomska flows between the Žežnička Greda (altitude ) and Javorak mountains. It has a curved flow around Lisina and Runjavica mountains, through  coniferous (fir and spruce) and mixed spruce-beech woods.

Its flow below Petrovo polje has sharp curves.

The richest right contributors are Manatovac (large stream), Mala Ilomska (Little Ilomska) and Devetero vrela (Nine springs), and  left tributary Crna rijeka (Black River).  At the Ravni Omar (mountain meadows), below Lisina Mountain, it enters a narrow highland continuing to “Korićanski most” (Korićani's Bridge), and a deep canyon below Korićanske stijene and Marića stijene (Marići's Rocks).

After two attractive Ilomska waterfalls, the river flows into the Ugar, a few kilometers downstream from Vitovlje village. The height of the bigger water flow is even (around) . Waterfalls in this wildness attract mountain-climbers, tourists and fishermen, and the vertical rocky wall under the river's falls is suitable for alpinist exercises.

History 
Above Ilomska River there is Korićani village and a canyon below it (Korićanske stijene), the scaffold of more than 200 Bosniaks and Croats – the victims of the Serbs Police and Army forces (on August 21, 1992), a crime prosecuted and sentenced through number of indictments at The ICTY Tribunal in The Hague.

See also 
 Imljani
 Skender Vakuf
 List of rivers of Bosnia and Herzegovina

References

External links 
https://archive.today/20140517202155/http://www.go2bosnia.com/upoznaj-bih/75-rijeka-ilomska-i-njeni-vodopadi

Rivers of Bosnia and Herzegovina